Kreplach (from ) are small dumplings filled with ground meat, mashed potatoes or another filling, usually boiled and served in chicken soup, though they may also be served fried. They are similar to Polish and Ukrainian uszka, Russian pelmeni, Italian ravioli or tortellini, German Maultaschen, and Chinese jiaozi and wonton. The dough is traditionally made of flour, water and eggs, kneaded and rolled out thin. Some modern-day cooks use frozen dough sheets or wonton wrappers. Ready-made kreplach are also sold in the kosher freezer section of supermarkets.

History
In Ashkenazi Jewish homes, kreplach are traditionally served on Rosh Hashanah, at the pre-fast meal before Yom Kippur, and on Hoshana Rabbah and Simchat Torah. 

Kreplach with vegetarian or dairy fillings are also eaten on Purim because the hidden nature of the kreplach interior mimics the "hidden" nature of the Purim miracle. In many communities, meat-filled kreplach are served on Purim. A variety with a sweet cheese filling is served as a starter or main dish in dairy meals, specifically on Shavuot. Fried kreplach are also a popular dish on Chanukah because they are fried in oil, which references the oil miracle of Chanukah.

Stuffed pasta may have migrated from Venice to the Ashkenazi Jews in Germany during the 14th century.

Name
The Yiddish word  kreplekh is the plural of krepl, a diminutive of krap, which comes from Yiddish's ancestor language Middle High German, where  meant "a piece of pastry". From the same source come the German  ("deep-fried pastry") and its East Central German dialectal variant .

By folk etymology, the name has been sometimes explained as standing for the initials of three Jewish holidays which are not real holidays; therefore the meat is covered in dough: K for (Eve of Yom) Kippur, R for (Hoshaana) Rabbah, and P for Purim, which together form the word KReP.

Shape
Some cooks use a square of dough that is filled and folded into triangles. Others use rounds of dough resulting in a crescent shape, or two squares of dough.

See also

Ravioli
Joshpara
Jewish cuisine
List of dumplings
Maultaschen

References

Ashkenazi Jewish cuisine
Dumplings
Israeli cuisine
Hanukkah foods
Purim foods
Rosh Hashanah foods
Yiddish words and phrases
Potato dishes
Chicken soups
Frozen food